Miss Brazil CNB 2022 was the 32nd edition of the Miss Brazil CNB pageant and the 7th edition under CNB Miss Brazil was held on August 4, 2022 at the CAESB Theatre in Águas Claras, Distrito Federal, Brazil. Each state, the Federal District and various Insular Regions & Cities competed for the title. Caroline Teixeira of Distrito Federal crowned her successor, Letícia Frota of Amazonas, at the end of the contest, who will represent Brazil at Miss World 2022.

Results 
Color keys
  The contestant won in an International pageant.
  The contestant was a Finalist/Runner-up in an International pageant.
  The contestant was a Semi-Finalist in an International pageant.
  The contestant did not place.

Placements 
Miss Brasil Mundo 2022 was broadcast live via Miss World official YouTube on August 4, 2022.  

Notes:

§ – placed into the Top 8 as the winner of Beauty with a Purpose Winner

Δ – placed into the Top 20 by fast-track challenges

Regional Queens of Beauty

Special Awards

Delegates
36 delegates competed for Miss Brasil Mundo 2022:

Notes

Withdrawals
 Costa Verde & Mar - Sarah Lemonie
 Pampa Gaúcho - Fernanda Craz

Table Notes

References

External links
 Official site (in Portuguese)
 Video of the Miss Brasil CNB 2022 contest (in Portuguese)

2022
2022 in Brazil
2022 beauty pageants
Beauty pageants in Brazil
Entertainment events in Brazil
Competitions in Brazil
August 2022 events in Brazil